Cnemaspis flavigaster , also known as the orange-bellied rock gecko, is a species of gecko endemic to Malaysia.

References

Cnemaspis
Reptiles described in 2008